Veronica Sirețeanu (born 4 November 1985) is a Moldovan economist. She has served in various governmental capacities at the Ministry of Finance of Moldova.

References 

1985 births
Living people
21st-century Moldovan economists
Women economists
21st-century Moldovan politicians
21st-century Moldovan women politicians